Asım Orhan Barut (June 6, 1926 – December 5, 1994) was a Turkish-American theoretical physicist.

Education
He received his undergraduate diploma and his Ph.D. degree both from the Swiss Federal Institute of Technology in Zurich in 1949 and 1952, respectively. He pursued his postdoctoral studies at the University of Chicago during 1953–1954.

Academic life
Barut was an assistant professor at Reed College during 1954-55 and then joined the faculty at Syracuse University in 1956. He became a professor of physics at the University of Colorado at Boulder in 1962 and served for 32 years.

Research areas
His research interests centered on group theoretic methods in physics. His books include Theory of the Scattering Matrix, Electrodynamics and Classical Theory of Fields and Particles and Representations of Noncompact Groups and Applications. Asım Orhan Barut was elected a fellow of the American Physical Society in 1966.

Publications

Barut's books 
Quantum Systems, Barut, Asim O.; Feranchuk, I. D.; Shnir, Yu M., 1995, World Scientific Publishing Company, Incorporated.
Polarization Dynamics in Nuclear & Particle Physics, Barut, Asim O., Paver, N.; Penzo, A.; Raczka, R., 1993, World Scientific Publishing Company. 
Spin & Polarization Dynamics in Nuclear & Particle Physics, 1990, World Scientific Publishing Company. 
New Frontiers in Quantum Electrodynamics & Quantum Optics, Barut, Asim O., 1990, Plenum Publishing Corporation. 
Geometry & Physics, Barut, Asim O., 1989, American Institute of Physics (A I P Press). 
Dynamical Groups & Spectrum Generating Algebra, Barut, Asim O.; Bohm, A.; Ne'Eman, Yuval, 1988, World Scientific Publishing Company. 
Dynamical Groups & Spectrum Generating Algebra, Barut, Asim O.; Bohm, A.; Ne'Eman, Yuval, 1988, World Scientific Publishing Company. 
Scattering Theory, Barut, Asim O. 1969, Gordon & Breach Publishing Group.
Electrodynamics and Classical Theory of Fields and Particles, 1964, Macmillan Company. 2012 Dover reprint

Editorships
Selected Scientific Papers of E. U. Condon, Barut, Asim O., 1991, Springer-Verlag New York. 
Selected Popular Writings of E. U. Condon, Barut, Asim O., 1991, Springer-Verlag New York. 
Selected Scientific Papers of Alfred Landé,  Barut, Asim O. (ed.), 1987, Kluwer Academic Publishers.
Conformal Groups & Related Symmetries - Physical Results & Mathematical Background, Barut, Asim O. (ed.), 1986, Springer-Verlag New York. 
Quantum Space & Time - The Quest Continues, Barut, Asim O. (ed.), 1984, Cambridge University Press. 
Quantum Electrodynamics & Quantum Optics, Barut, Asim O. (ed.), 1984, Plenum Publishing Corporation. 
Quantum Theory, Groups, Fields & Particles, Barut, Asim O. (ed.), 1983, Kluwer Academic Publishers. 
Electrodynamics & Classical Theory of Fields & Particles, Barut, Asim O., 1980, Dover Publications, Incorporated. 
Foundations of Radiation Theory & Quantum Electrodynamics,  Barut, Asim O. (ed.), 1980, Plenum Publishing Corporation. 
Group Theory in Non-Linear Problems, NATO Advanced Study Institute, Barut, Asim O. (ed.), 1974, Kluwer Academic Publishers. 
Studies in Mathematical Physics, NATO Advanced Study Institute, Barut, Asim O. (ed.), 1973, Kluwer Academic Publishers. 
Lectures in Theoretical Physics, Barut, Asim O. (ed.), 1973, University Press of Colorado. 
Boulder Lecture Notes in Theoretical Physics, Barut, Asim O. (ed.), 1967, Gordon & Breach Publishing Group.

References

External links
Asim Orhan Barut Biography: http://asimorhanbarut.com/
SpringerLink - Journal Article
Foundations of Physics - Journal Memorial Issue

1926 births
1994 deaths
American academics of Turkish descent
American physicists
ETH Zurich alumni
Fellows of the American Physical Society
Members of the Turkish Academy of Sciences
Particle physicists
People associated with CERN
People from Malatya Province
Reed College faculty
Recipients of TÜBİTAK Science Award
Science teachers
Syracuse University faculty
Turkish physicists
Theoretical physicists
University of Colorado faculty
University of Colorado Boulder faculty